"Tears Run Rings" may refer to

 "Tears Run Rings" (song), a song from the 1988 Marc Almond album The Stars We Are
 Tears Run Rings (band), a 21st-century American shoegaze band